Josef Dvořák (born 25 April 1942 in Horní Cerekev, Protectorate of Bohemia and Moravia) is a Czech actor. He started his career in Kadaň from where Pavel Fiala took him to Kladivadlo in Ústí nad Labem. He was an external actor in theatre Semafor from 1972 to 1990. In 1990 he established his own theatre company Divadelní společnost Josefa Dvořáka. He is famous for his many movie roles of Vodník.

Discography
1985 František Nepil - Five wonderful uncles - Bonton Music, CD,
1995 Wasserman school Josef Dvorak - Bonton, CD
1995 Košlerová - Teddy Bears Stories- Supraphon, CD, 
1997 Rudolf Čechura - A re Maxipes Fík - Supraphon, CD
1997 Jirásek, Dvořák, Fiala - Dvořák v Lucerně - Supraphon, CD
1997 Košlerová - Bee Teddies Other Stories - Supraphon, CD, 
1998 Rudolf Čechura - Wild dreams Maxipes Fík - Supraphon, CD
1999 Rudolf Čechura - Maxipes Fík goes the world - Supraphon, CD
1999 O vodníkovi Čepečkovi - Supraphon, CD
2000 Štíplová - Byla jednou koťata - Supraphon, CD
2001 Josef Dvořák - Boříkovy lapálie - Fonia, CD
2003 Skoumal - Když jde malý bobr spát. Písničky pro děti - Supraphon, CD, j
2004 Josef Dvořák - Gold - Boříkovy lapálie - Popron Music, CD
2004 Pohádky z vánočního stromku - Supraphon, CD, 
2004 Večerníčkův kolotoč pohádek - Supraphon, CD, 
2004 Košlerová - Včelí medvídci a Pučmeloud - Supraphon, CD, 
2005 Kytice - Supraphon, 2 CD, 
2007 Pohádky s pejsky, psy a hafany - Supraphon, CD, 
2010 Rumcajs, Manka a Cipísek - Supraphon, 3 CD, 
2011 Don Špagát - Supraphon, CD,

External links
Filmography

1942 births
Living people
People from Horní Cerekev
Czech male stage actors
Czech male film actors
Czech male television actors
Czech male voice actors
Czech television actors
Czech theatre directors
People of the StB
Recipients of Medal of Merit (Czech Republic)